"The Fusilli Jerry" is the 107th episode of the sitcom Seinfeld. Featuring the introduction of David Puddy, the episode also features Kramer receiving vanity plates that say "ASSMAN" as well as marital problems between George's parents. This is the 21st episode of the sixth season. It aired on April 27, 1995.

Since its release, "The Fusilli Jerry" has seen positive critical reception and has appeared on rankings of the best Seinfeld episodes.

Plot
Elaine starts dating Jerry's mechanic, David Puddy. During their first night in bed, Puddy performs a sex move which she recognizes as Jerry's. Jerry is appalled when he hears about this. He goes to chew Puddy out, and finds someone else to look into his car. Puddy maintains that he was doing the same move before Jerry told him about it, but is so psyched out by Jerry's accusation that he can't do the move, so he uses George's move. Jerry suspects that his new mechanic is over-pricing the repair bill on his car, so Elaine asks Puddy how much he charges, proving Jerry's theory. He gives Puddy permission to do the move so he can take his car back to him.

George is unable to excite his girlfriend during sex, and asks Jerry to teach him the move. He can't remember the details correctly and eventually resorts to taking notes on his hand. His girlfriend is disgusted when she notices the notes.

Kramer goes to the Department of Motor Vehicles for his new license plate, but is instead given vanity plates which say "ASSMAN". He suspects that the plate was meant for a proctologist, and uses this theory to his advantage, by parking in a "Doctors Only" spot when he goes to pick up George's mother Estelle after her eye job. The plate also scores him cat calls from passing drivers, and a date with a big-bottomed woman named Sally.

Estelle cannot cry for ten days or risk ruining the eye job. When Kramer drives her home, he runs over a pothole and pushes his arm on Estelle, which she interprets as her husband Frank's move ("stopping short"). Frank is upset at this, and finds Kramer at Jerry's apartment. A fight ensues, causing Frank's rear end to land on a "Fusilli Jerry" — a pasta statue made by Kramer that resembles Jerry doing a stand-up routine.

Later, when the gang takes Frank to a proctologist, Kramer spots a picture of a boat called "ASSMAN". He approaches the doctor and confirms that their plates got mixed up. That night, Frank and George come home from the proctologist, and Estelle is so overwhelmed with relief that she starts to cry, ruining her eye job.

Production
"The Fusilli Jerry" had a large number of writers. Marjorie Gross and her brother Jonathan came up with the Jerry, George, and Elaine stories; Ron Hauge and Charlie Rubin came up with the license plate story; and Marjorie Gross wrote the actual teleplay. The writers had not intended for David Puddy to be funny himself, only to serve as a foil to Elaine, and so were impressed with how funny Patrick Warburton made the character in his audition.

The sequence where Frank Costanza falls on "Fusilli Jerry" required numerous takes, with actor Jerry Stiller making a different vocalization of pain on each take. Throughout the scene Julia Louis-Dreyfus, who played Elaine, had to dig her fingernails into her skin to keep from breaking out into laughter at Stiller's performance; she can be seen doing this in the finished episode when Stiller first comes in.

Reception
"The Fusilli Jerry" has generally attracted positive reception from critics. In 1995, John P. McCarthy of Variety said of the episode, "Only Seinfeld could deal with proctology, lovemaking techniques and corkscrew pasta in the same half-hour, and with hilarious results." David Sims of The A.V. Club called the episode "the 'classic' episode of season 6, the episode with tropes everyone remembers, much like 'The Puffy Shirt' of season 5, 'The Contest' of season 4 and so on and so forth." Sims also praised the clever intersection of the episode's plotlines as well as Kramer's story arc, dubbing the episode the "best Kramer episode ever."

Rolling Stone named the episode one of the "10 Seinfeld Episodes You Forgot You Loved" that gets "unfairly overlooked." Vulture named "The Fusilli Jerry" the fourteenth best Seinfeld episode, praising the "brilliant way" Kramer stops short on Estelle Costanza as well as the introduction of David Puddy.

Callback
In the Seinfeld episode "The Understudy," Kramer gives Bette Midler a "Macaroni Midler," calling back to this episode's "Fusilli Jerry."

References

External links
 

Seinfeld (season 6) episodes
1995 American television episodes